Wang Dong (born September 10, 1981 in Qingdao, Shandong) is a retired Chinese footballer.

Club career
Wang Dong began his professional football career in 2001 when second division side Changchun Yatai promoted him to their first team and where in his debut season he would quickly establish himself within the team by making 19 appearances and scoring 5 goals. He continued to establish himself in the subsequent seasons and see the club become genuine promotion contenders, which they eventually achieved in 2005 when they won promoted to the Chinese Super League. Playing in the top tier Wang Dong impressed many with his scoring and passing ability and would aid the club to a fourth-place finish. The Chinese Super League 2007 season would go on to be a highlight in his career as he won the title with Changchun Yatai playing a key role in central midfield.

At the beginning of the 2009 league season Wang Dong saw his playing time limited due to injury, however once he recovered he decided to go on trial for Australian team Newcastle Jets. When nothing came from the trial and with Wang Dong fully recovered he would return to China to go on to spearhead Changchun's late title challenge, which saw the club lose the title by a single point at the end of the 2009 season. With Wang Dong once again a vital member of the team he would then go on to play in the 2010 AFC Champions League where he played in five games including a 9–0 victory against Persipura Jayapura, which stands as the biggest victory any Chinese side has achieved within the competition.

In January 2014, Wang transferred to China League One side Chongqing Lifan with a fee of ¥3,500,000.
On 13 December 2016, Wang moved to Super League side Tianjin Teda.
On 8 February 2018, Wang was loaned to his hometown club Qingdao Huanghai in the China League One.

International career
Wang Dong was selected for the senior national team by head coach Zhu Guanghu to take part in a friendly against Honduras on February 12, 2006 in a game that China lost 1–0. This was followed by another friendly match against Thailand on August 10, 2006 where Wang Dong would score his debut goal in a 4–0 victory. After that game he would go on to be an integral part of the Chinese team playing predominantly out of position in right midfield. Nevertheless, Wang Dong was selected in the squad to participate in the 2007 AFC Asian Cup where he played in all the group games in an unsuccessful competition for China. He did however score two of China's five goals in a 5–1 victory over Malaysia. When new head coach Vladimir Petrović came in after the tournament Wang Dong would continue to be a regular within the team for their Fifa World Cup qualifiers. After Vladimir Petrović's disappointing reign ended Wang Dong would stop being called up to the national team.

Career statistics
.

Honours

Club
Changchun Yatai
Chinese Super League: 2007
Chinese Jia B League: 2003

Chongqing Lifan
China League One: 2014

Qingdao Huanghai
China League One: 2019

Individual
 China League One Most Valuable Player: 2014

References

External links

 
Player stats at Sohu.com
Squad Profile at Asian Red Dragons website

1981 births
Living people
Association football midfielders
Chinese footballers
Footballers from Qingdao
China international footballers
2007 AFC Asian Cup players
Changchun Yatai F.C. players
Chongqing Liangjiang Athletic F.C. players
Tianjin Jinmen Tiger F.C. players
Qingdao F.C. players
Chinese Super League players
China League One players
China League Two players